Primrose Schools is an American chain of accredited early childhood education centers headquartered in Atlanta, Georgia. It has over 465 franchised schools in 33 states and provides education and care to over 60,000 children. All Primrose schools are accredited through Cognia (education), formerly AdvancED, and the organization was the first preschool to receive AdvancED's Corporation Systems Accreditation under the new Early Learning Standards.

History
Primrose Schools was founded as Primrose Country Day School in 1982 in Marietta, Georgia by Paul and Marcy Erwin. In 1988, Jo Kirchner, the company's current CEO, was hired as a consultant to help shift the then half-day preschool to a full-day model, as well as to assist in the launch of the Primrose franchising concept. The fourth Primrose school opened that year, and it was the first to be franchised. Kirchner officially joined Primrose as its vice president in 1990 and continued to assist the Erwins in the rollout of the Primrose franchising concept in Georgia and the development of the corporation's school assessment model. In 1996, Primrose became the first childcare and early childhood education company to receive accreditation from the Commission on International and Trans-Regional Accreditation (CITA), the Southern Association of Colleges and Schools Council on Accreditation and School Improvement (SACS CASI), and the North Central Association Council on Accreditation and School Improvement (NCA CASI). The Erwins retired in 1999 and sold Primrose Schools to Greenwich, Connecticut-based Security Capital Corporation, after which Kirchner was named president and CEO of Primrose. In 2001, Primrose launched its Balanced Learning curriculum, which used child development research to improve its existing proprietary curriculum.

American Capital Strategies acquired Primrose from Security Capital in 2006 for approximately $63 million. Kirchner continued her role as president and CEO, and over the next two years, Primrose signed its 250th franchise agreement and expanded and improved its curriculum programs, particularly in the areas of language and technology. Primrose's Education Advisory Board was established in 2008 and is made up of early childhood education and childhood development experts who assist in improving and enhancing Primrose's curriculum and methodologies.

Primrose continued to expand and innovate, doubling its system revenues from 2004 to 2009, and opening its first urban school in 2010.  The Primrose School of Education was also established in 2010 and provides professional support and educational resources for Primrose franchise owners and school leadership teams. AdvancED selected Primrose to help develop and test its new Standards for Quality Early Learning Schools in 2012, and Primrose became the first to be awarded AdvancED's Corporation Systems Accreditation under the new standards.

Curriculum
Primrose offers full early childhood education and care for children ages 6 weeks to 6 years and after-school programs for children up to age 12. Primrose schools employ the company's proprietary Balanced Learning curriculum, which combines traditional, teacher-guided learning with more child-initiated play. The curriculum also incorporates current research on child development and emphasizes building character in students. Primrose Schools' learning philosophy consists of four major components—theme-based learning, which uses topics of interest to children to place concepts in context; an academic curriculum which focuses on school readiness in math, language, and literacy; enrichment programs, which include music, arts, gardening, and foreign language, among other activities; and character development. Community outreach is a central part of the character development component of the Primrose curriculum. For example, each year, students in Primrose schools throughout the country participate in food drives in which children are encouraged to complete extra chores at home in order to earn money to shop for items to donate. Primrose also places an emphasis on parent communication in order to foster the connection between home and school, which creates continuity in the children's educational experience. Schools provide orientation sessions for parents of new students, a variety of parenting and educational resources online, and regular communication with parents through newsletters, conferences, and school events.

Social responsibility
Primrose emphasizes community service and social responsibility at all levels of its organization, from its corporate culture to its curriculum. Defined as one of the corporation's core values, "giving without expecting" is central to the overarching Primrose Promise initiative, which includes programs such as the Primrose Children's Foundation and the Helping Hands Program, as well as numerous independent community service efforts at individual schools. Through the Primrose Children's Foundation, Primrose Schools has supported and partnered with several organizations that focus on the health, welfare, education, and overall support of children, including Children's Miracle Network and Ronald McDonald House Charities. In 2014, Primrose raised over $500,000 for charity, including over $340,000 for its current charitable partners, Reach Out and Read and Save the Children.

Primrose Children's Foundation
Founded in 2005, the Primrose Children's Foundation is a non-profit organization that combines the fundraising efforts of Primrose Schools across the country to make a larger national impact through charitable support that advances child advocacy and education efforts. Among the foundation's first partnerships was Reach Out and Read, an organization that focuses on the promotion of early literacy. Since 2005, the Primrose Children's Foundation has donated more than $1.4 million to Reach Out and Read. In 2014, Primrose announced a first-of-its-kind partnership with Save the Children through the Primrose Children's Foundation that focuses on the sponsorship of at-risk children in underserved communities within the United States, providing educational resources to those communities and developing relationships between sponsored children and children in Primrose classrooms.

Accreditation
Primrose is accredited through several organizations and also has an internal quality assurance system. In 1998, Primrose received its first Corporate Accreditation from AdvancED, and in 2012 the organization was the first to earn AdvancED Corporation Systems Accreditation under the new Standards for Quality Early Learning Schools, which is the highest level of accreditation available for preschools. Primrose Schools was also the first early learning institution to require all of its schools to be individually accredited through either the Southern Association of Colleges and Schools Council on Accreditation and School Improvement (SACS CASI) or the North Central Association Commission on Accreditation and School Improvement (NCA CASI). In addition to external accreditations, each Primrose school undergoes internal reviews three times annually under the company's Service Excellence Assurance (SEA) quality assurance program.

Organization

Locations and franchising

Each Primrose school is independently owned and operated by franchise owners who undergo training at both the Primrose corporate campus in Georgia and with experienced franchise owners before opening a school. Franchise owners are provided with a system of support via field consultants and ongoing training opportunities. Primrose currently operates over 465 Primrose schools in more than 33 states. As of 2014, its largest markets include the metropolitan areas of Atlanta, Georgia; Dallas-Fort Worth, Texas; Houston, Texas; and Denver, Colorado.

Primrose primarily targeted suburban markets for franchising until 2010, when the company opened its first urban prototype school in Atlanta's Midtown neighborhood after recognizing a lack of child care options in the urban setting. The Primrose urban school concept has since expanded to include a franchise in Houston, Texas, with additional urban locations in Denver, Dallas, and Philadelphia. In 2014, Primrose opened its first California school in Pleasanton and its first Boston-area school in Burlington.

In 2013, the company began extending financial incentives to potential franchise owners in an effort to double its number of franchises by 2020.

As of July 2022, there are nearly 475 schools operating in 33 states, and the company is on target to open its 500th location by early 2023.

References

Early childhood education
Early childhood education in the United States
Private equity portfolio companies
Companies established in 1982
Preschools in the United States